The athletics competition at the 2011 All-Africa Games was held from 11 to 15 September 2011 at the Estádio do Zimpeto in Maputo, Mozambique.

Medal summary

Men

Women

Para-sport

Men

Women

Medal tables

Elite competition

Para-sport competition

Games statistics
At the competition Jangy Addy (Liberia) won the first ever International athletic event gold medal for his country.

References

Makori, Elias (2011-09-15). From Daegu to Maputo, Jeylan and Montsho rule! - All Africa Games. IAAF. Retrieved on 2016-08-23.
Makori, Elias (2011-09-17). Rare medals for Kenya as curtain falls on 10th All Africa Games. IAAF. Retrieved on 2016-08-23.

External links
Medallists
 Results of Maputo All-Africa Games at All-Athletics.com

Athletics Medallists by Event
Athletics Medal Standings
Results

 
2011
All-Africa Games
Athletics
2011 All-Africa Games